The Knights of Pythias Building in Phoenix, Arizona, was built in 1928. It has served as a clubhouse and as a specialty store. It was listed on the National Register of Historic Places in 1985.

It was designed by local architects Lescher & Mahoney.

Images

References

Clubhouses on the National Register of Historic Places in Arizona
Buildings and structures in Phoenix, Arizona
Knights of Pythias buildings
National Register of Historic Places in Maricopa County, Arizona